Snezhanka Tower (кула „Снежанка“) is a 156-metre-high television tower built of reinforced concrete with an observation deck near Pamporovo, Bulgaria.

The tower has a café with a panoramic view of the Rhodope, the Rila and the Pirin Mountains, even the Aegean Sea being visible on a clear day.

See also 

 List of towers
 List of tallest structures in Bulgaria

External links
 Pictures and description in Bulgarian
 

Towers in Bulgaria
Buildings and structures in Smolyan Province